Sheila Corkhill (also Grant) is a fictional character from British soap opera, Brookside played by Sue Johnston.  Sheila appeared in Brookside from the first episode in 1982 until the character's departure in 1990. Her most famous storyline was in 1986, when the character was attacked, raped and beaten by an unknown assailant. Everyone was a suspect, including family friend Matty Nolan (Tony Scoggo), and most residents of Brookside Close found themselves accused. It was later revealed that the taxi driver raped Sheila.

Character
The Grant family consisted of Bobby (Ricky Tomlinson), Sheila, Barry (Paul Usher), Karen (Shelagh O'Hara) and Damon (Simon O'Brien). The Grants appeared in the first episode (although Karen's appearance was fleeting and uncredited) and were the first to move into the new houses on Brookside Close. Prior to moving onto Brookside Close, the Grant family were from a run-down inner-city council estate, however through Bobby and Sheila's thrift they had managed to move to the 'middle class' Brookside Close.

Sheila was portrayed as a devout Roman Catholic, and as such her views were often to come into conflict with the socialist views of her husband.

Storylines
After Bobby had spent his first months of Brookside Close fighting to save his job and 200 others at Fairbanks Engineering, Sheila is the one made redundant in 1983.  In an attempt to occupy herself she joined Annabelle Collins' (Doreen Sloane) Ratepayers Association and forged an unlikely friendship with her.  The two however disagree when Sheila nominated Roger Huntingdon (Rob Spendlove) as chairman instead of Annabelle and when they clash over what type of group it should be with Annabelle wanting it to be an apolitical group bringing issues such as hedges and refuse collection to the attention of the council while Sheila wanted to use it to campaign about the poor standard of schooling in the area and the lack of jobs for their children. Later, in an attempt to make a living, Sheila establishes a non-registered employment agency. This has the unfortunate result of having friend Matty Nolan (Tony Scoggo) prosecuted for benefit fraud.

In 1984, Sheila became pregnant with her and Bobby's fourth child, despite both of them being well over 40. Their daughter Claire (Amy Lynch) was born on 8 January 1985 - the very first baby to be born in the series, more than two years after its inception. However, the downside to this was that parenthood so late in life put pressure of the Grant's marriage. The Grant family started to break-up from 1986, first with Karen leaving to go to university in London.  In 1987, Damon was stabbed and died on Lendal Bridge in York. Bobby and Sheila persuaded Barry not to go after revenge (something he didn't do until Damon's murderers were released in 2003), but the strain this put on her caused a rift in her marriage.  To try and recuperate, Sheila and Bobby leave for a stay with Sheila's sister Margaret Jefferson (Barbara Marten) and her husband Tony (Richard Walker), but to no avail, and the marriage continues to collapse.  After months of tension between him and Sheila, Bobby left her and the soap in 1988. Despite Barry and Sheila's best efforts, without Bobby's wage they fall behind with the mortgage repayments and their home is repossessed, later being bought by Frank Rogers (Peter Christian).  Sheila is devastated by this, as the home represents everything she and Bobby had worked for, and later confided to a priest "I know we are not supposed to value material things, but it's different – it's a home".  Barry lived in a Volkswagen camper van while Sheila moved into friend Billy Corkhill's (John McArdle) house with Claire.

Rape

In 1986, the most notable story line regarding Sheila was broadcast.  The story was written in order to keep Sue Johnston on the soap, who had previously expressed an interest in leaving.  In 1986, Sheila was raped after getting out of a taxi. Following her ordeal she bathed, removing any evidence that could have incriminated her attacker. There were three suspects: former friend Matty Nolan, who was furious with her for wrecking his marriage by telling his wife he'd been having an affair; neighbour Pat Hancock (David Easter), who had gotten drunk after a violent argument with this girlfriend and couldn't remember what he'd been up to; and lecturer Alun Jones (Norman Eshley), who had unsuccessfully tried to initiate an affair. However it soon emerged that none of them were guilty, and the rape had been committed by the taxi driver who had just dropped Sheila off. Sheila later discovered she was pregnant as a result of the rape but had a miscarriage.

Billy Corkhill
Sheila spends Christmas 1988 with Billy and the two get on well.  Later when Debbie McGrath (Gillian Kearney) comes around with Simon, Sheila's grandson (whom Sheila thought was miscarried due to a lie from Debbie's father), Sheila, Billy and Debbie take him to the park and Sheila and Billy grow closer.  On Christmas evening, Billy gives Sheila her present, some rosary beads which he had bought from the Cathedral, knowing how important her Catholic religion was to her.  Billy also buys a set for Claire.

Sheila goes to confide in a priest she does not know about her failed marriage with Bobby, her repossession and meeting Debbie (whom she refers to as Damon's wife) and her grandson Simon.  She does not mention Billy to him, although infers his presence.  That night Sheila goes missing from Billy's house and he finds her having broken into her boarded up old home, sitting in Damon's old room remembering him and the happy times she had had in that house.

Feeling she is still married to Bobby in the eyes of the church and her growing relationship with Billy is sinful, Sheila insists in leaving, although Billy tells her that his home is her home and tells her she is more than welcome.  Nonetheless, Sheila is intent on leaving.  On New Year's Eve, however, Sheila slips out of a party early to be with Claire.  Billy follows her and the two kiss, starting a relationship between them.

Departure
Sheila and Billy marry in September 1990 and left Brookside to live in Basingstoke, Hampshire with Sheila's sister Margaret, eventually selling No.10 to Billy's son Rod (Jason Hope) and his wife Diana (Paula Frances).

Return
Sheila Corkhill returned, without Billy, in the straight-to-video special The Lost Weekend in 1997. She returned again the following year another straight-to-video special, Friday the 13th, to attend the wedding of her niece-in-law Lindsey Corkhill (Claire Sweeney) and Peter Phelan (Samuel Kane), however she became caught up in trouble when her brother-in-law Jimmy (Dean Sullivan) is pursued by drug-dealers intent on killing him.  Here, she reveals to sister-in-law Jackie (Sue Jenkins) that she and Billy have split up after an argument over Billy's ex-wife Doreen (Kate Fitzgerald), although Jimmy mentioned that Billy and Sheila were "still together" in a conversation with neighbour Diane Murray (Bernie Nolan) in 2001. This was either a continuity error, or Billy and Sheila are presumed to have reconciled.

Reception
The character was selected as one of the "top 100 British soap characters" by industry experts for a poll to be run by What's on TV, with readers able to vote for their favourite character to discover "Who is Soap's greatest Legend?" A writer for Inside Soap branded the character "St Sheila" and said she "endured tragedy after tragedy". They praised Johnston's performance in the wake of Sheila's rape, calling it "the soap's greatest moment."

References

Grant, Sheila
Grant, Sheila
Grant, Sheila
Female characters in television